Spanish Fly is a 2002 American comedy-drama film directed by Will Wallace, and follows the use of an aphrodisiac in a Los Angeles nightclub.

Cast
 David Shackelford as Leonard
 Will Wallace as Gordy
 Judy Geeson as Miss England
 Anthony Crivello as Tony
 Carlos Alazraqui as Enrique
 Robert Merrill as Oedipus boy
 Joe Estevez as Harry Homeless
 Katrina Holden Bronson as Anda
 Tom J. Jones as T.J.
 Ruben Pla as Henpecked Hank
 Tess Hunt as Whinnie Whipcream
 Larry Romano as John (NY)
 Dana Lee as Dr. Wang
 Jonathan Abrahams as Yoga Jon
 Lisa Ann Morrison as Yoga Jean
 Eric Martsolf as Brick Hauser
 Kyle Dunnigan as Skippy
 Paul Vogt and Peter Allen Vogt as Brick's managers

Accolades
Director Will Wallace won the Festival Prize for Best Comedy Feature at the Deep Ellum Film Festival in 2002.

External links
 Spanish Fly at the Internet Movie Database

2003 films
2003 comedy films
2000s English-language films
Films directed by Will Wallace